Alexandr Kontarev (born 18 May 1938) is a Soviet hurdler. He competed in the men's 110 metres hurdles at the 1964 Summer Olympics.

References

1938 births
Living people
Athletes (track and field) at the 1964 Summer Olympics
Soviet male hurdlers
Olympic athletes of the Soviet Union
Place of birth missing (living people)